Benjamin Ward (August 10, 1926 – June 10, 2002) was the first African American New York City Police Commissioner.

Early life
Ward was one of 11 children and was born in the Weeksville section of Brooklyn, New York. He attended Brooklyn Automotive Trades High School, graduating in 1944. Drafted into the Army after high school, he served as a military policeman and a criminal investigator with the Army in Europe for two years.

Career in the NYPD
Ward entered the NYPD on June 1, 1951, as a patrolman, becoming the first black officer assigned to Brooklyn's 80th Precinct, where he faced resentment from both white residents and white fellow cops. He wasn't assigned a locker at the precinct, forcing him to dress at home and ride the New York City Subway to work in his uniform for three years.

During the next 15 years in uniform, he rose through the ranks to lieutenant, serving in the Patrol Division, Juvenile Aide Division, Detective Division, and Legal Bureau. His rise was aided, in part, by his after-work studies at Brooklyn College and Brooklyn Law School (class of '65) that earned him undergraduate and law degrees—invariably with top honors.

He eventually served as special legal counsel to Police Commissioner Howard R. Leary. Ward left the uniformed ranks to become executive director of NYPD's Civilian Complaint Review Board in 1966. 
 
Two years later he was named a Deputy Police Commissioner of Trials, serving as chief hearing officer in all departmental disciplinary matters.

Later he became Deputy Commissioner of Community Affairs with responsibilities for the Youth Aid Division and the Auxiliary Forces Section.

Mayor John V. Lindsay designated Ward as Traffic Commissioner in 1973. Under his leadership, uniformed traffic controllers from his agency took on street duties, thereby freeing hundreds of police officers from traffic direction posts. The following year he headed up what is now known as the Criminal Justice Agency that performs bail risk evaluations.
 
Three years later, Mayor Edward I. Koch named him to the first of three posts in his administration: Chief of the New York City Housing Authority.

On August 13, 1979, he was designated to run the New York City Department of Corrections. He served as commissioner until December 31, 1983, when he accepted an appointment by Koch as New York City Police Commissioner.

Ward was sworn in by Mayor Koch as the city's thirty-fourth Police Commissioner on January 5, 1984. He was the first African American to hold that position. Ward oversaw the nation's largest police department during increased drug use, ex. crack and a sharp increase in related crime, including drug related murders. Ward's ownership also coincided with a period of culminating in the Tompkins Square Park Riot.

Criticism of response to Philip Cardillo's murder
See 1972 Harlem Mosque incident

On April 14, 1972, Patrolman Philip Cardillo and Vito Navarra responded to a "10–13" call at 102 E. 116th St. in Harlem, which was a Nation of Islam mosque where Malcolm X used to preach. Upon arriving inside, they were ambushed by 15 to 20 men, one of whom, according to the ballistics report, shot Cardillo at point blank range. Most of the police were forced out of the mosque and locked out, leaving a dying Cardillo and officers Victor Padilla and Ivan Negron locked inside. Police eventually managed to break down the door and witnessed a man named Louis 17X Dupree standing over Cardillo with a gun in hand. Before Dupree could be taken into custody, however, Louis Farrakhan and Charles B. Rangel arrived at the scene, threatening a riot if Dupree was not released. Just as the police forensics unit was about to seal off the crime scene, they were ordered out of the mosque by the police brass.  Outside a mob had overrun the street and overturned a police cruiser. Ward released the 16 suspects, an action for which he was later criticized by a grand jury. He also apologized to the minister, Louis Farrakhan, for violating an agreement that the police would not enter the mosque.

Life after retirement
Ward retired as NYC Police Commissioner on October 22, 1989. After his retirement, he remained active, teaching and serving on various boards until failing health forced him to curtail such endeavors.

He served as an adjunct professor of law at Brooklyn Law School, an adjunct professor of corrections at the John Jay College of Criminal Justice, and an adjunct professor of the Hudson Valley Community College in Troy.

Ward's personal papers are housed in the Lloyd Sealy Library Special Collections at John Jay College of Criminal Justice.

Death
Benjamin Ward died on June 10, 2002, at the age of 75.

See also
Tompkins Square Park Police Riot

References

Further reading
Benjamin Ward Papers, Lloyd Sealy Library Special Collections, John Jay College of Criminal Justice (view upon appointment)
Cannato, Vincent J. "The Ungovernable City: John Lindsay and His Struggle to Save New York". New York: Basic Books, 2001. 703 pages.
Jurgensen, Randy, and Robert Cea. "Circle of Six: The True Story of New York's Most Notorious Cop-Killer And the Cop Who Risked Everything to Catch Him". New York: Disinformation Co.; London: Virgin [distributor], 2006. 256 pages.

1926 births
2002 deaths
People from Crown Heights, Brooklyn
United States Army soldiers
New York City Police Department officers
African-American people in New York (state) politics
New York City Police Commissioners
Brooklyn College alumni
History of New York City
Brooklyn Law School alumni
African-American police officers
United States Army personnel of World War II
20th-century African-American people
21st-century African-American people